The 2014 Mountain West Conference women's basketball tournament will be held on March 10–15, 2014 at the Thomas & Mack Center in Las Vegas, Nevada. With San Jose State and Utah State added to the MWC, the MWC will have an 11 team tournament for 2014. The top 5 seeds will get the first round bye. For the 2nd year in a row all games but the championship will be streamed online through the Mountain West Network. CBS Sports Network will air the championship. The tournament champion will receive the Mountain West's only bid to the 2014 NCAA tournament.

Seeds
Teams are seeded by conference record, with a ties broken by record between the tied teams followed by record against the regular-season champion, if necessary.

Schedule

Bracket

References

2013–14 Mountain West Conference women's basketball season
Mountain West Conference women's basketball tournament